Feria is Latin for "holiday".

Feria may refer to:
Feria, in Roman Rite liturgy, a day of the week, other than Sunday, on which no feast is celebrated
Feria (festival) festival in Spain and southern France, characterized by bullfights, bull running in the streets, bodegas 
Feria, San Felipe, Zambales barangay in the Philippines
Typhoon Feria
Feria, a composition by Maurice Ravel (1875-1937)
Feria, a composition by Magnus Lindberg
 Feria: The Darkest Light, a Spanish fantasy thriller television series released in 2022

See also 
 Faria (disambiguation)
 Ferrier (disambiguation)